Passaloecus insignis  is a Palearctic species of solitary wasp.

References

External links
Images representing Passaloecus insignis 

Hymenoptera of Europe
Crabronidae
Insects described in 1829